Windthorst is a town in Archer and Clay counties in the U.S. state of Texas. It is part of the Wichita Falls, Texas Metropolitan Statistical Area. The population was 409 at the 2010 census. The town is named for Ludwig Windthorst, a Catholic statesman in Germany.

Windthorst is the home of the St. Mary's Grotto, a Roman Catholic outdoor shrine, which was paid for with money sent home by 64 military service members from Windthorst who served in World War II. All of the 64 returned home. A new entrance to the shrine was constructed in 2009.

Geography
Windthorst is located in northern Texas, primarily in eastern Archer County but extending eastward into Clay County. U.S. Route 281 passes through the center of the town, leading north  to Wichita Falls and southeast  to Jacksboro. Texas State Highway 25 leads west from the center of Windthorst  to Archer City, the Archer County seat.

Demographics

As of the census of 2000, there were 509
people, 154 households, and 119 families residing in the town. The population density was 175.9 people per square mile (68.0/km2). There were 162 housing units at an average density of 64.8 per square mile (25.0/km2). The racial makeup of the town was 83.86% White, 0.23% Native American, 14.09% from other races, and 1.82% from two or more races. 23.41% of the population were Hispanic or Latino of any race.

There were 154 households, out of which 40.9% had children under the age of 18 living with them, 71.4% were married couples living together, 1.9% had a female householder with no husband present, and 22.7% were non-families. 21.4% of all households were made up of individuals, and 9.7% had someone living alone who was 65 years of age or older. The average household size was 2.86 and the average family size was 3.34.

In the town, the population was spread out, with 31.8% under the age of 18, 7.7% from 18 to 24, 28.4% from 25 to 44, 18.6% from 45 to 64, and 13.4% who were 65 years of age or older. The median age was 32 years. For every 100 females, there were 111.5 males. For every 100 females age 18 and over, there were 106.9 males.

The median income for a household in the town was $37,708, and the median income for a family was $45,000. Males had a median income of $30,833 versus $17,917 for females. The per capita income for the town was $16,146. About 6.5% of families and 8.0% of the population were below the poverty line, including 8.3% of those under age 18 and 10.1% of those age 65 or over.

Education
Windthorst is served by the Windthorst Independent School District. Windthorst High School is a University Interscholastic League Class A school in education and sports. The school has won state championships in volleyball, football, baseball, softball, and track; its most recent championship is the 2020 Class 2A-D2 Football State Championship.

Notable people

 Hank Gremminger, American football player

References

External links

 Windthorst Independent School District
 Handbook of Texas Online: Windthorst, Texas

Towns in Archer County, Texas
Towns in Clay County, Texas
Towns in Texas
Wichita Falls metropolitan area